Jamie Curtis-Barrett (born 19 April 1984 in Grimsby, Lincolnshire) is an English snooker player.

Career
After playing snooker from the age of 11, Curtis-Barrett drifted away from the game after the death of his grandfather who had been a huge influence on his game. He began playing regularly again in the 2000s and earning a sponsor in 2009.

As an amateur, he entered qualifying for both the 2015 Australian Goldfields Open and 2016 German Masters, losing in the first qualifying round of both tournaments.

Curtis-Barrett turned professional in 2016 after finishing second on the Q-School Order of Merit. He won three matches in his opening season; defeating James Cahill 5–3 in Shanghai Masters qualifying before being eliminated by Jamie Jones; Matthew Selt 4–2 at the Northern Ireland Open before losing in the second round to David Gilbert; and a single frame encounter with Sam Baird in the Snooker Shoot-Out, where he was knocked out in the second round by eventual winner Anthony McGill. His season ended on a low note when he was whitewashed 10-0 by Jamie Jones in the first round of qualifying for the World Championship.

Entry to the shoot out in 2018 was followed by a first round defeat to Zhang Yong. He entered Q school at the end of the 2017/18 season in a bid to win back his place on the world snooker tour, he won in the first round against Belgium's Hans Blanckaert.

Performance and rankings timeline

Career finals

Amateur finals: 1 (1 title)

References

External links

Jamie Curtis-Barrett at worldsnooker.com

English snooker players
Living people
1984 births
Sportspeople from Grimsby